Belarus competed at the 2014 Summer Youth Olympics, in Nanjing, China from 16 August to 28 August 2014.

Medalists
Medals awarded to participants of mixed-NOC (Combined) teams are represented in italics. These medals are not counted towards the individual NOC medal tally.

Archery

Belarus qualified a male and female archer from its performance at the 2013 World Archery Youth Championships.

Individual

Team

Athletics

Belarus qualified seven athletes.

Qualification Legend: Q=Final A (medal); qB=Final B (non-medal); qC=Final C (non-medal); qD=Final D (non-medal); qE=Final E (non-medal)

Boys
Track & road events

Field Events

Girls
Track & road events

Field events

Boxing

Belarus qualified two boxers based on its performance at the 2014 AIBA Youth World Championships

Boys

Canoeing

Belarus qualified two boats based on its performance at the 2013 World Junior Canoe Sprint and Slalom Championships.

Boys

Girls

Cycling

Belarus qualified a boys' and girls' team based on its ranking issued by the UCI.

Team

Mixed Relay

Diving

Belarus qualified two divers based on its performance at the Nanjing 2014 Diving Qualifying Event.

Gymnastics

Artistic Gymnastics

Belarus qualified one athlete based on its performance at the 2014 European MAG Championships and another athlete based on its performance at the 2014 European WAG Championships.

Boys

Girls

Rhythmic Gymnastics

Belarus qualified one athlete based on its performance at the 2014 Rhythmic Gymnastics Grand Prix in Moscow.

Individual

Trampoline

Belarus qualified one athlete based on its performance at the 2014 European Trampoline Championships.

Judo

Belarus qualified two athletes based on its performance at the 2013 Cadet World Judo Championships.

Individual

Team

Modern Pentathlon

Belarus qualified two athletes based on its performance at the 2014 Youth A World Championships.

Rowing

Belarus qualified one boat based on its performance at the 2013 World Rowing Junior Championships.

Qualification Legend: FA=Final A (medal); FB=Final B (non-medal); FC=Final C (non-medal); FD=Final D (non-medal); SA/B=Semifinals A/B; SC/D=Semifinals C/D; R=Repechage

Shooting

Belarus was given a wild card to compete.

Individual

Team

Swimming

Belarus qualified four swimmers.

Boys

Girls

Tennis

Belarus qualified one athlete based on the 9 June 2014 ITF World Junior Rankings.

Singles

Doubles

Wrestling

Belarus qualified one athlete based on its performance at the 2014 European Cadet Championships.

Girls

References

2014 in Belarusian sport
Nations at the 2014 Summer Youth Olympics
Belarus at the Youth Olympics